Andre H. Schmid is a Canadian academic, author and former Director of the Centre for the Study of Korea at the University of Toronto.

Early life
Schmid was awarded his Ph.D. at Columbia University in New York. He received his undergraduate degree from the University of Toronto.

Career
Schmid is Associate Professor in the Department of East Asian Studies at the University of Toronto.  His research interests include the cultural history of the Cold War and the historiographical literature on 19th century peasant movements. He is best known for his award-winning 2002 book, Korea Between Empires, 1895-1919 (Columbia University Press).

Selected works
In a statistical overview derived from writings by and about Roman Ghirshman, OCLC/WorldCat encompasses roughly 10+ works in 20+ publications in 5 languages and 1,000+ library holdings.

 Constructing Independence: Nation and Identity in Korea, 1895-1910 (1996)
 Nation Work: Asian Elites and National Identities (2000)
 Korea between Empires, 1895-1919 (2002)

Articles
 "Rediscovering Manchuria: Sin Ch'aeho and the Politics of Territorial History in Korea," The Journal of Asian Studies, Vol. 56, No. 1 (February 1997).
 "Colonialism and the 'Korea Problem' in the Historiography of Japan: A Review Article," The Journal of Asian Studies, Vol. 59, No. 4 (November 2000), pp 951–976. 
  "Looking North toward Manchuria," The South Atlantic Quarterly, Vol. 99, No. 1, Winter 2000, pp. 219–240.
 
  Review of "Marginality and Subversion in Korea: the Hong Kyŏngnae Rebellion of 1812," Harvard Journal of Asiatic Studies, Vol. 70, No. 1, June 2010, pp. 257–264.

Honors
 Association for Asian Studies, John Whitney Hall Book Prize, 2004.

Notes

References
 Cupe 3902 (Canadian Union of Public Employees, Local 390).  "University of Toronto community opposes campus closure during the G20," EduFactory Web Journal, 29 May 2010.
 Myers, Ramon H., Mark R. Peattie and Andre Schmid.  Communications to the Editor: "Mark Peattie and Ramon Myers respond to Andre Schmid's "Colonialism and the Korea Problem' in the Historiography of Modern Japan," The Journal of Asian Studies, Vol. 60, No. 3 (Aug., 2001), pp. 813–816.

Historians of Korea
Koreanists
Living people
Year of birth missing (living people)
Academic staff of the University of Toronto
Columbia Graduate School of Arts and Sciences alumni
University of Toronto alumni